Brawlhalla is a free-to-play fighting game developed by Blue Mammoth Games and published by Ubisoft for macOS, PlayStation 4, Windows, Nintendo Switch, Xbox One, Android and iOS, with full cross-play across all platforms. The game was shown at PAX East in April 2014 and went into alpha later that month. An open beta became available in November 2015, followed by the game's release in October 2017. Launching with 34 characters, as of July 2022, the game features 57 playable characters called "Legends", each with their unique stats, loadout, and available cosmetic skins.

On March 5, 2018, Brawlhalla developer-publisher Blue Mammoth Games was acquired by the video game publisher Ubisoft. As a result of this, Rayman, alongside two other characters from the franchise, were added to the game on November 6, 2018.   Brawlhalla was released for Nintendo Switch and Xbox One on the same day.

On July 6, 2018, Ars Technica released an article detailing precise player counts for Steam games obtained through a leak as a result of a "hole" in its API. This leak showed Brawlhalla to be ranked 24th in player count on Steam with a total of 8,646,824 players, out of all games featuring the Steam Achievements system. The Android version has more than 10 million downloads. Ubisoft reported more than 20 million players by February 2019. As of April 2022, Brawlhalla has more than 80 million players.

Gameplay
In most of Brawlhallas game modes, the goal is to knock one's opponent into one of four areas outside of the visual boundaries of the map referred to as blastzones, similar to Super Smash Bros. This can be done either by forcing them into one of the blastzones with an attack, or by preventing them from returning to stage and allowing gravity to force them into the bottom blastzone. Damage can be seen on the color display around each player's character icon, which darkens progressively from white to red to black as the character continues to get hit. The darker the color is, the farther the character will be knocked back when hit until a hit forces them into a blastzone. Entering a blastzone will result in the player losing a stock and their character respawning on stage. Either the last player with at least one stock or the player with the most points wins the match.

The game supports both local and online play. Competitive players can compete in 1-on-1 to climb through the rankings. They can also find a partner to play against other duos to increase their collaborative rank in either the standard stock game mode queue or a rotating queue that features a different game mode each season. Brawlhalla also has several casual modes: Free-For-All, 1v1 Strikeout, Experimental 1v1, and a different featured mode every week. Free-For-All is a chaotic mode where 4 players knock each other out to gain points. In 1v1 Strikeout, players pick 3 characters which they play for 1 stock each. Experimental 1v1 allows players to test out upcoming features against each other. Custom games can be hosted online and locally, and they support up to 8 players per match, experimental maps, and region changing. You may join groups of your friends to create a clan, with multiple ranks within the clans. Clans are only available on PC. Clans gain experience from all members.

Brawlhalla features simple controls and one-button special moves. This allows new players to pick up the game quickly. Controls include movement keys and buttons for attacking, performing special moves, picking up or throwing weapons, and dodging. Keys can be rebound for the keyboard and a large variety of controllers.

Players can move by running left and right and jumping. Players can perform quick dashes sideways on the ground and dodges in the air or on the ground, either sideways or vertically. It is also possible to dodge right after an attack to keep pressure on the opponent. Once in the air, the player has the option to perform any combination of three jumps, a directional air-dodge, a grounded move in the air by using a "gravity-cancel", and "fast-falling". It is also possible to hold on to the sides of stages, similar to the style in Mega Man X.

During a match, gadgets (which can be switched off in the ranked game modes) and weapon drops fall from the sky semi-randomly and can be picked up by the players. Although the weapon drop sprite has the appearance of a sword it turns into a corresponding weapon for the legend that picks it up. All of Brawlhalla'''s characters can use 2 weapons out of 13 to fight each other. Weapons include blasters, katars, rocket lance, sword, spear, cannons, axe, gauntlets, hammers, bow, scythe, orb, greatsword and battle boots. Blasters, rocket lances, bows, and spears perform well at a distance from the opponent, while katars and gauntlets are more effective up close. Rocket lance allows for quick traversal of the stage. Cannon, greatsword, and hammer all do large amounts of damage. Sword, orb, katars and battle boots are fast and low damaging. All characters have unarmed attacks, should they be disarmed. Gadgets like bombs, mines, and spike balls are also used. Weapons can also be thrown to interrupt the enemy's moves or to make it difficult for them to get back to the stage. Each character has 3 special or "signature" moves per weapon, for a total of 6 per character.

Four stats are assigned to each character: Strength, Dexterity, Defense, and Speed, each with a rating up to 10 (maximum 22). The combination of these stats determines the strengths and weaknesses of a character and affects how they're played, and can be slightly modified using stances- which move a point from one stat to another.

 Business model Brawhalla is free-to-play, based on the freemium business model. The game offers 9 selectable characters to use for free from a weekly rotation, making it more accessible for newer players. This number of free rotation characters increased from 6 in late 2018 to 8 in August 2020. There are currently 57 player characters, called "Legends" (as of February 2023). To fully purchase characters, Brawlhalla offers an in-game shop, giving a chance for players to use the in-game currency earned through matches, daily missions, and level-ups. Alternatively, players can purchase all existing and future characters via a one-time transaction of $19.99.

Other products are also available to purchase here, using a premium currency called Mammoth Coins. This currency is gained by purchasing them with real money. Mammoth coins can be used for products such as character skins, podiums, KO effects, weapon skins, avatars, sidekicks, and emotes that can be used in matches. Since some characters share a weapon type, players can customize their characters with weapon skins from skins purchased with other character skins. Also in the shops are skin chests, being updated every day. These chests offer many of the skins purchasable within the shop at a discounted price while offering 2 to 3 skins exclusive to the chest. These chests cost 100 Mammoth Coins to purchase, and when purchased, the chest will randomly give the purchaser one of the skins offered.

Brawlhalla has also introduced a battle pass system with 85 tiers of exclusive skins, emotes, and colors. The battle pass system has a weekly set of missions to be completed during matches, which range from straightforward tasks such as KOing with certain weapons to missions based on the in-universe lore. Completing each mission awards the player with "Battle Gems". Gems can also be obtained from ordinary daily missions, and a random number of either 2, 6, or 12 will be awarded after a player obtains a certain amount of XP from playing matches. The XP needed for each set of gems increases the more times a player has obtained the gems. Every 12 gems unlock a new tier of rewards on the reward track. With more desirable items, the paid track of rewards can be purchased for $9.99, but there is a free track with fewer rewards for casual players.

 Cross-play Brawlhalla introduced cross-play across all platforms on October 9, 2019. Cross-play allows players on PC, Nintendo Switch, PlayStation 4, PlayStation 5, Xbox One, Android and iOS to queue against each other in online ranked play and to create custom lobbies which a player on any platform can join.

 Anti-cheat 
From the start, Brawlhalla contained various anti-cheats that are not specified by the developers. Since October 26, 2021, EasyAntiCheat, software owned by Epic Games is in place.

Due to its incompatibility with 32-bit OSs, it is only required for Ranked and Tournament lobbies. EAC also "locks" the game files, making modded gameplay impossible while using it.

Playable Characters

 Crossovers Characters 
Many characters have skins that serve as crossover characters from other franchises. 
These characters can only be obtained through "mammoth coins" and not normal coins. They remain available in Brawlhalla's store even after the crossover event ends.
The franchises and characters are as follows:Adventure Time Finn
 Jake
 Princess BubblegumAssassin's Creed Ezio Auditore da Firenze
 Eivor VarinsdottirAvatar: The Last Airbender Aang
 Zuko
 TophBen 10 Four Arms
 Diamondhead
 HeatblastCastlevania
 Alucard
 Simon Belmont
G.I. Joe
 Snake Eyes
 Storm Shadow
Hellboy
 Hellboy
 Gruagach
 Daimio
 Nimue
Kung Fu Panda
 Po
 Tigress
 Tai Lung
Rivals of Aether
 Ranno
Rayman
 Rayman
 Globox
 Barbara
Shovel Knight
 Shovel Knight
 Black Knight
 King Knight
 Plague Knight
 Specter Knight
 Enchantress

Steven Universe
 Stevonnie
 Pearl
 Amethyst
 Garnet
Street Fighter
 Ryu
 Ken
 Chun-Li
 Sakura
 Dhalsim
 Luke
 M. Bison
 Akuma
Teenage Mutant Ninja Turtles
 Leonardo
 Donatello
 Raphael
 Michelangelo
The Walking Dead
 Rick Grimes
 Michonne
 Daryl Dixon
 Maggie Greene
 Negan
Tomb Raider
 Lara Croft
WWE
 The Rock
 John Cena
 Xavier Woods
 Becky Lynch
 Macho Man
 The Undertaker
 Asuka
 Roman Reigns

Esports
While minor events have been held by the community since its closed beta launch, Blue Mammoth Games now hosts its official competitive events.

In May 2016, they led off with the Brawlhalla Championship Series or "BCX". It was a series of 21 weekly online tournaments starting on June 18.

In 2017, Blue Mammoth Games announced the Brawlhalla Circuit, a worldwide circuit of tournaments. Players are awarded Points. Players with the highest points from each region at the end of the season will earn a spot in the World Championship in November.

At the start of 2018, Blue Mammoth Games announced their third year of official tournaments. This included a partnership with DreamHack to host 6 in-person tournaments throughout the year, including official tournaments in Europe.

In 2019, Blue Mammoth Games planned to host 5 in-person tournaments at their events throughout the year.

In more recent competition the Brawlhalla Pro Series (North America) was a weekly event that started April 9, 2019 and ended May 4, 2019. 

In 2020, Brawlhalla Esports shifted to an online-focused competition due to the global pandemic.

2016 World Championship 
The Brawlhalla World Championship is a tournament held by Blue Mammoth Games at their end-of-the-year event, BCX (Brawlhalla Championship Expo).

The event took place at the Cobb Galleria in Atlanta in the United States. Players competed locally from November 11–13. The World Championship was separated into two separate open tournaments (1v1 and 2v2). The first 1v1 World Championship title was won by Zack "LDZ" January, and the first 2v2 World Championship titles were won by Diakou "Diakou" State and Tyler "Twilight" Whitaker.

2017 World Championship 
The Brawlhalla World Championship became an annual event in 2017. The event once again took place at the Cobb Galleria in Atlanta in the United States where players competed locally on November 3–5. The 2016 1v1 World Champion Zack "LDZ" Janbay won for the second year in a row, while the 2v2 championship was won by Zack "Boomie" Bielamowicz and Ngwa "Remmy" Nforsi.

2018 World Championship 
The 3rd annual Brawlhalla World Championship was an open tournament with players being seeded based on official tournament power rankings. It took place on November 16–18 inside DreamHack Atlanta. The championship was played alongside tournaments of other popular fighting games, such as Super Smash Bros. Melee, Dragon Ball FighterZ and Tekken 7. The 1v1 World Championship title was claimed by Stephen Myers, known as "Sandstorm" and the 2v2 World Championship title went to Jonatan "Cake" Övragård and Aleksi "Addymestic" Sillanpää of Team PHZ.

2019 World Championship 
The 4th annual Brawlhalla World Championship took place at DreamHack Atlanta. The 1v1 World Championship was won for a second time by Stephen "Sandstorm" Myers, and for the first time, the 1v1 winner also won the 2v2 World Championship - alongside his teammate Zack "Boomie" Bielamowicz.

2020 World Championship 
The 5th annual Brawlhalla World Championship was shifted to an online competition due to the Coronavirus pandemic. The North American 1v1 World Championship was won for a third time by Stephen "Sandstorm" Myers, and the 2v2 World Championship title went to "Sandstorm" alongside his teammate "Boomie" for the second time in a row.

2021 World Championship 
The 6th annual Brawlhalla World Championship was also an online competition. The North American 1v1 World Championship was won for the first time by "Cody Travis". The 2v2 North American World Championship title was won by "Sandstorm" and his teammate "Boomie" for the third time in a row.

2022 World Championship 
The North American 1v1 World Championship was won by "Impala", and the 2v2 World Championship title went to "Snowy" alongside his teammate "Boomie"(his 5th time winning).

Reception

Kotaku summarized that "Brawlhalla is a dynamic take on platform brawler that feels good to play." They said that the best innovations to the platform brawlers before it are its jumps and wall movements. Three jumps and nearly unlimited wall scaling make for fresh strategies and the buff in mobility means a lot of the high-adrenaline action happens off-stage. Push Square stated that while it is not quite as tightly designed as the seminal Super Smash Bros., the large roster, a wide range of modes, and a reasonable level of depth help it achieve a similar balance of accessibility and challenge, scoring it at 7 out of 10. Nintendo Life said that it "stands as a solid example of how to do a proper platform fighter, with several game modes, a diverse cast and a beautiful art style making this one easy to recommend." PCMag summarised it as "a worthwhile entry in the platform fighting genre that you can enjoy for free."

On the PlayStation store chart, it was the 2nd most downloaded game in North America, and number 3 in Europe.

References

External links 
 

2017 video games
 Indie video games
 Ubisoft games
 Early access video games
Free-to-play video games
 Free online games
 Crossover fighting games
 Esports games
 Multiplayer and single-player video games
 Fighting games
MacOS games
 Windows games
 Nintendo Switch games
PlayStation 4 games
PlayStation Network games
Platform fighters
 Video games containing battle passes
 Video games developed in the United States
 Video games with cross-platform play
 Xbox One games
 Xbox One X enhanced games
 Android (operating system) games
IOS games
Dark fantasy video games
Steampunk video games
Video games set in the Viking Age
Video games based on Norse mythology
Video games about valkyries
Video games about pirates
Video games about dragons
Video games about extraterrestrial life